The IEEE Koji Kobayashi Computers and Communications Award is  a Technical Field Award of the IEEE established in 1986.  This award has been presented annually since 1988 for outstanding contributions to the integration of computers and communications.

The award is named in honor of Koji Kobayashi, who has been a leading force in advancing the integrated use of computers and communications.

The award may be presented to an individual, multiple recipients or team of up to three people.

Recipients of this award receive a bronze medal, certificate, and honorarium.

The award is sponsored by NEC.

Recipients 

 1988: Stuart Wecker
 1989: Alexander G. Fraser
 1990: Elwyn R. Berlekamp
 1991: Stephen S. Lavenberg
 1991: Martin Reiser
 1992: Vinton G. Cerf
 1992: Robert E. Kahn
 1993: Gottfried Ungerboeck
 1994: Jonathan Shields Turner
 1995: Norman Abramson
 1996: K. Mani Chandy
 1997: Tim Berners-Lee
 1998: Jack Keil Wolf
 1999: Whitfield Diffie
 1999: Martin Hellman
 1999: Ralph Charles Merkle
 2000: Ronald L. Rivest
 2000: Adi Shamir
 2000: Leonard Adleman
 2001: John M. Cioffi
 2002: Van Jacobson
 2003: Bruce Hajek
 2004: No Award
 2005: Frank Kelly
 2006: Nicholas F. Maxemchuk
 2007: Donald F. Towsley
 2008: Don Coppersmith
 2009: Nick McKeown
 2010: Larry L. Peterson
 2011: Thomas J. Richardson
 2011: Rüdiger L. Urbanke
 2012: Jean Walrand
 2013: Thomas Anderson
 2014: George Varghese
 2015: Albert Greenberg
 2016: Leandros Tassiulas
 2017: Kannan Ramchandran
 2018: Victor Bahl
 2019: R. Srikant
 2020: Balaji Prabhakar
 2021: Hari Balakrishnan
 2022: Muriel Medard

References

External links 
 IEEE Koji Kobayashi Computers and Communications Award page at IEEE
 List of recipients of the IEEE Koji Kobayashi Computers and Communications Award

Koji Kobayashi Computers and Communications Award